Pabstiella trimeropetala is a species of orchid plant native to Brazil.

References 

trimeropetala
Flora of Brazil